Billy the Kid Versus Dracula is a 1966 American horror Western film directed by William Beaudine. The film is about Billy the Kid (Chuck Courtney) trying to save his fiancée from Dracula (John Carradine). The film was originally released as part of a double feature along with Jesse James Meets Frankenstein's Daughter in 1966.  Both films were shot in eight days at Corriganville Movie Ranch and at Paramount Studios in mid-1965; both were the final feature films of director Beaudine. The films were produced by television producer Carroll Case for Joseph E. Levine.

Plot
The film centers on Dracula's plot to convert Billy the Kid's fiancé, Betty Bentley, into his vampire bride. Dracula impersonates Bentley's deceased uncle, calling himself "Mr. Underhill", and schemes to make her his vampire bride. A German immigrant couple come to work for her and warn Bentley that her "uncle" is a vampire. While Bentley does not believe them, their concerns confirm Billy's suspicions that something is not quite right with Betty's uncle.

Eventually, the Count kidnaps Betty and takes her to an abandoned silver mine. Billy confronts the Count, but soon finds that bullets are no match for a vampire. The Count subdues the notorious outlaw and sets out to transform Betty into his vampire bride. Just then, the town sheriff and a country doctor arrive. The doctor hands Billy a silver scalpel, telling him he must drive it through the vampire's heart. Billy throws his gun at the vampire and knocks him senseless, making him easy pickings for a staking. With the Count destroyed, Betty is saved and Billy takes her away, presumably to live happily ever after.

Cast
 Chuck Courtney as William "Billy the Kid" Bonney
 John Carradine as Count Dracula / James Underhill
 Melinda Plowman as Elizabeth (Betty) Bentley
 Virginia Christine as Eva Oster
 Walter Janovitz as Franz Oster
 Bing Russell as Dan "Red" Thorpe
 Olive Carey as Dr. Henrietta Hull
 Roy Barcroft as Sheriff Griffin
 Hannie Landman as Lisa Oster
 Richard Reeves as Pete (saloon keeper)
 Marjorie Bennett as Mary Ann Bentley
 William Forrest as James Underhill
 George Cisar as Joe Flake
 Harry Carey, Jr. as Ben Dooley (wagon master)
 Leonard P. Geer as Yancy (as Lennie Geer)
 William Challee as Tim (station agent)

Production
The film was announced for production as early as June 22, 1965, in Daily Variety announcing both Billy the Kid Versus Dracula and Jesse James Meets Frankenstein's Daughter. Principal photography began on June 22, 1965. Both films were the last features directed by William Beaudine, Sr. Beaudine spent the rest of his career following these films filming television. The film was completed on July 9, 1965, and was completed with a budget surplus of $25,000. Each of the two features were shot in eight days in California's Red Rock Canyon, Corrigan Ranch and Paramount Studios. According to the assistant to the producer Howard W. Koch, Jr., they "were made as cheap as movies can be made."

Release
According to the American Film Institute, an official release date of the film is not confirmed. The film was shown as early as March 30, 1966, in New Haven, Connecticut. Box office reports in the September 28, 1966, issue of Variety stated that it was featured on a double bill that month as a reissue in St. Louis, Missouri.

Home media
Billy the Kid Versus Dracula was released on DVD by the label Cheezy Flicks on October 25, 2005 and again on DVD by Cheezy Flicks in a compilation titled Shockorama: The William Beaudine Collection. The film is set for release on blu-ray and DVD by KINO Lorber Studio Classics on August 20, 2019.

Reception
John Carradine later spoke on the film, "I have worked in a dozen of the greatest, and I have worked in a dozen of the worst. I only regret Billy the Kid Versus Dracula. Otherwise, I regret nothing." and again "My worst film? That's easy, a thing called Billy the Kid Versus Dracula...It was a bad film. I don't even remember it. I was absolutely numb!" Critic and historian Tom Weaver stated that the film could have earned "the semi-respectability" of Curse of the Undead, another vampire-themed Western "if it was truer to vampire lore, if it didn't feature a 'name' outlaw like Billy the Kid, if the vampire in it weren't Dracula, and if Carradine's performance was much better. (That's a lot of ifs.)"

See also 

 List of horror films of 1966
 Vampire film
 Weird West

References

External links

 
 
 
 

1966 films
1966 horror films
1960s supernatural horror films
1960s Western (genre) horror films
American Western (genre) horror films
American supernatural horror films
American vampire films
Films about Billy the Kid
Dracula films
Embassy Pictures films
1960s English-language films
Films directed by William Beaudine
Films scored by Raoul Kraushaar
Films shot in California
Western (genre) crossover films
1960s American films
Horror crossover films
English-language horror films